Marleau is a surname. Notable people with the surname include:

Jim Marleau (born 1947), American politician
Louise Marleau (born 1944), Canadian actress
Marie-Ève Marleau (born 1982), Canadian diver
Patrick Marleau (born 1979), Canadian ice hockey player
Robert Marleau, Canadian civil servant